The Millionaire Vagrant is a 1917 American silent drama film directed by Victor Schertzinger and starring Charles Ray, Sylvia Breamer and J. Barney Sherry.

Cast
 Charles Ray as Steven Du Peyster 
 Sylvia Breamer as Ruth Vail 
 J. Barney Sherry as Malcolm Blackridge 
 John Gilbert as James Cricket
 Elvira Weil as Peggy O'Connor 
 Dorcas Matthews as Betty Vanderfleet 
 Aggie Herring as Mrs. Flannery 
 Josephine Headley as Squidge 
 Carlyn Wagner as Rose 
 Walt Whitman as Old Bookkeeper

References

Bibliography
 Golden, Eve. John Gilbert: The Last of the Silent Film Stars. University Press of Kentucky, 2013.

External links
 

1917 films
1917 drama films
1910s English-language films
American silent feature films
Silent American drama films
Films directed by Victor Schertzinger
American black-and-white films
Triangle Film Corporation films
1910s American films